The Child's Child is the 14th novel written by Ruth Rendell under the pseudonym Barbara Vine, and the first such novel in 4 years, since 2008's The Birthday Present. The novel was published in the United States in December 2012 and in the UK by Penguin Viking in March 2013. In a number of interviews Rendell has intimated that this will be the last novel she writes under the Vine pseudonym.

The narrator of the novel is a Grace Easton, a woman writing a PhD thesis about unmarried mothers. Grace shares a house inherited from their grandmother with her gay brother Andrew.

References

Novels by Ruth Rendell